Lesoma is a village in North-West District of Botswana. It is located in the eastern part of the district, which before 2001 formed Chobe District and is close to town of Kasane. Lesoma has both primary and secondary schools, and the population was 410 in 2001 census.

References

North-West District (Botswana)
Villages in Botswana